National Tertiary Route 700, or just Route 700 (or ) is a National Road Route of Costa Rica, located in the Alajuela province.

Description
In Alajuela province the route covers San Carlos canton (Quesada district).

Junction list
The route is entirely in Quesada district.

History
Route created in 2020 over an existing road between Route 141 and the in construction south segment of Route 35.

References

Highways in Costa Rica